Cheng Meng (also spelled Chheng Meng, born 27 February 1998) is a Cambodian footballer who plays for the Visakha in the Cambodian League and the Cambodia national football team. He is of Chinese descent.

International career
Meng represented Cambodia at two Southeast Asian Games in 2017 and 2019. To date, he has made 53 international appearances at all levels, including 27 at senior level.

References

1998 births
Living people
Cambodian footballers
Cambodia international footballers
People from Koh Kong province
Association football defenders
Nagaworld FC players
Competitors at the 2017 Southeast Asian Games
Competitors at the 2019 Southeast Asian Games
Cambodian people of Chinese descent
Southeast Asian Games competitors for Cambodia
Visakha FC players
Cambodian Premier League players